Pedda kadabur is a village and a Mandal in Kurnool district in the state of Andhra Pradesh in India.

Geography

References 

Villages in Kurnool district